"Reality Stars: The Musical" is the fifth episode of the ninth season of the American reality competition television series RuPaul's Drag Race, which aired on VH1 on April 21, 2017. The episode has contestants take selfies with the Pit Crew for the mini challenge, and perform a Hamilton-inspired musical about the Kardashian family and other celebrities for the main challenge. Todrick Hall and Meghan Trainor serve as guest judges, alongside regular panelists RuPaul, Michelle Visage, and Carson Kressley.

Episode

Mini challenge

The remaining eleven queens pose in a sexy selfie with the Pit Crew. Alexis Michelle wins the challenge.

Main challenge
For the main challenge ("Kardashian: The Musical"), contestants perform a Hamilton-inspired lip sync musical about the Kardashian family and other celebrities. As the winner of the mini challenge, Alexis Michelle assigns the following roles:

Runway

RuPaul introduces guest judges Todrick Hall and Meghan Trainor, and reveals the theme for the runway: "Faux Fur Fabulous". During the judges critiques, Aja, Eureka, Sasha Velour, Trinity Taylor, and Valentina are declared safe. Alexis Michelle, Peppermint, and Shea Couleé received high critiques for their performances, though Michelle received negative commentary about her runway look. Cynthia Lee Fontaine, Farrah Moan, and Nina Bo'Nina Brown were all criticized for their performances. Nina Bo'Nina Brown was declared safe. Cynthia Lee Fontaine and Farrah Moan lip-synced against each other to Trainor's "Woman Up". Unexpectedly, RuPaul eliminates Eureka from the competition due to an injury that occurred in the second episode's cheerleading challenge; as a result, Cynthia Lee Fontaine and Farrah Moan are declared safe from elimination.

Reception
Joyce Chen of Us Weekly said Shea Couleé "stole the show" with her performance and portrayal of Blac Chyna. Kris Jenner has praised the episode, and Alexis Michelle's impression of her. In 2018, In magazine's Bianca Guzzo ranked "Kardashian: The Musical" number seven on her "definitive ranking of all the musicals" on the series.

See also 

 List of Rusicals

References

2017 American television episodes
American LGBT-related television episodes
Cultural depictions of Britney Spears
Cultural depictions of Paris Hilton
RuPaul's Drag Race episodes
Television shows related to the Kardashian–Jenner family